Kurcze  is a village in the administrative district of Gmina Czersk, within Chojnice County, Pomeranian Voivodeship, in northern Poland. The village has a population of 103.

See also 
 History of Pomerania.

References

Kurcze